Sarah Desjardins (born ) is a Canadian actress. She is known for playing Whitney in the 2011 The Hub miniseries Clue, and Jenna Hope in the YouTube Premium series Impulse. Desjardins has also had recurring roles on multiple television series, portraying Catherine in the first season of the Syfy fantasy horror television series Van Helsing, Maddy in the last four parts of the Netflix spy series Project MC<sup>2<sup>, and Donna Sweett in the fourth season of The CW supernatural horror television series Riverdale. Since 2022, she has played the recurring role of Callie on the Showtime drama series Yellowjackets.

Early life 
Desjardins was born and raised in Vancouver, British Columbia and she has one younger brother.

Desjardins knew she wanted to act from a young age and upon expressing interest in acting at age six, her parents got her an agent. However, realizing the work that would be involved including the expenses, travel, and line memorization, they pulled her out and encouraged her to pursue it if she was still interested when she got older. In high school, Desjardins decided to try acting again and got headshots and an agent.

Career 
Desjardins first role was in 2011 in Magic Beyond Words, a made-for-TV movie about the life of J.K. Rowling where Desjardins portrays a younger version of Rowling's sister Diane. As well, Desjardins has guest starred in numerous shows such as Supernatural and Imaginary Mary. Desjardins has also starred in numerous made-for-TV movies, including the 2016 TV movie, Unleashing Mr. Darcy in which she portrayed Zara Darcy in a modern remake of Pride and Prejudice. In 2017, she starred in the Drink, Slay, Love, a Lifetime movie about teenage vampires.

In 2016, she had a recurring role in Van Helsing, a post-apocalyptic show about a woman who can turn vampires human. Desjardins finds herself playing Catherine, a character who comes in with a group of refugees and takes a younger girl, Callie, under her wing. That same year, she began a recurring role on the Netflix series Project MC2. In the series she portrays Maddy McAlister, the older sister to main character McKeyla, who, along with her friends, is recruited to join a spy organization and use STEM to save the day. Her character is a top spy agent and must figure out whether her sister has crosse onto the dark side. She describes her character as having two sides, both loving and supportive as well as cold and sinister.

In December 2016, it was announced that Desjardins would star in Impulse, a show on YouTube Premium about a 16-year-old girl named Henry who can teleport. The series is set in the same universe as the 2008 science-fiction film, Jumper and is based on the 2013 book of the same name by Steven Gould. Initially auditioning for the lead role of Henrietta "Henry" Coles, Desjardins instead plays her soon-to-be stepsister, Jenna, whom she grows close to after finding out she was sexually assaulted by a classmate. Desjardins describes her character as multifaceted, being both a popular girl and Henry's confidante after her assault. As well, she describes Jenna as someone who doesn't know what she wants or who she is. The first season premiered on June 6, 2018, while the second premiered on October 16, 2019, however the series was cancelled in March 2020.

In 2019, Desjardins began a recurring role on the fourth season of The CW drama series Riverdale, as Donna Sweett, a classmate whom Jughead Jones meets at his new school, Stonewall Prep and later becomes one of the antagonists.  In 2021, Desjardins began a recurring role on the Showtime series Yellowjackets as the ungrateful daughter of Shauna, a woman who survived a plane crash when she was in high school.

Filmography

Notes

References

External links 
 

Actresses from Vancouver
Canadian film actresses
Canadian television actresses
Living people
21st-century Canadian actresses
Year of birth missing (living people)